The Countess of Bridgewater may refer to the wife or widow of an Earl of Bridgewater, such as:

Frances Egerton, Countess of Bridgewater (1583–1636), art patron and book collector
Elizabeth Egerton, Countess of Bridgewater (1626–1663), English writer and daughter of William Cavendish, 1st Duke of Newcastle 
Jane Egerton, Countess of Bridgewater  (–1716), daughter of Charles Paulet, 1st Duke of Bolton, and Mary Scrope
Charlotte Catherine Anne, Countess of Bridgewater (1763–1849), English philanthropist and widow of John Egerton, 7th Earl of Bridgewater